Acanthoscelidius is a genus of minute seed weevils in the beetle family Curculionidae. There are about 14 described species in Acanthoscelidius.

Species
These 14 species belong to the genus Acanthoscelidius:

 Acanthoscelidius acephalus (Say, 1824) i g b
 Acanthoscelidius californicus (Dietz, 1896) i c
 Acanthoscelidius curtus (Say, 1831) i b
 Acanthoscelidius frontalis (Dietz, 1896) i c
 Acanthoscelidius griseus (Dietz, 1896) i c
 Acanthoscelidius guttatus (Dietz, 1896) i c b
 Acanthoscelidius ilex (Dietz, 1896) i c
 Acanthoscelidius isolatus Sleeper, 1955 i c
 Acanthoscelidius mendicus (Dietz, 1896) i c b
 Acanthoscelidius perplexus (Dietz, 1896) i c
 Acanthoscelidius pusillus (Dietz, 1896) i c
 Acanthoscelidius tarsalis (Dietz, 1896) i c
 Acanthoscelidius tenebrosus Colonnelli, 2004 c
 Acanthoscelidius utahensis (Tanner, 1934) i b

Data sources: i = ITIS, c = Catalogue of Life, g = GBIF, b = Bugguide.net

References

Further reading

 
 
 

Curculionidae
Articles created by Qbugbot